The 2014 AIBA Women's World Boxing Championships was initially scheduled to be held in Edmonton, Alberta, Canada. from September to October 2014. Boxing Canada withdrew from hosting when it could not find a venue that was available for dates suitable for AIBA, and the competition was held at the Halla Gymnasium of Jeju City, South Korea between 13 and 25 November 2014.

Schedule
10 events were to be held.

Medal summary

Medal table

Medalists

References

 
2014
International boxing competitions hosted by South Korea
2014 in South Korean sport
Jeju City
2014 in women's boxing